Dichomeris agorastis is a moth of the family Gelechiidae. It was described by Edward Meyrick in 1931. It is known from northeastern India.

References

agorastis
Moths described in 1931
Taxa named by Edward Meyrick